Kadiana (or Kariana) is a medium size village in Phillaur tehsil of Jalandhar District of Punjab State, India. The village is administrated by a sarpanch who is an elected representative of village as per Panchayati raj (India).

Education 
The village has a Punjabi medium, Co-educational primary school (GPS Kadiana School) founded in 1967. The schools provide mid-day meal as per Indian Midday Meal Scheme and the meal prepared in school premises.

Transport

Rail 
Phillaur Junction is the nearest train station.

Air 

References 

Villages in Jalandhar district
Villages in Phillaur tehsil